Sanchai Ratiwatana and Sonchat Ratiwatana were the defending champions, but decided to compete at the ATP Challenger Guangzhou instead.
Henri Kontinen and Konstantin Kravchuk won the title, defeating Pierre-Hugues Herbert and Albano Olivetti in the final, 6–4, 6–7(3–7), [10–7].

Seeds

Draw

Draw

References
 Main Draw

Challenger La Manche - Doubles
2014 Doubles